Emiliano Figueroa Larraín (July 12, 1866 – May 15, 1931) was President of Chile from December 23, 1925 until his resignation on May 10, 1927. He also served as Acting president for a few months in 1910.

Biography
Figueroa was born on July 12, 1866 in Santiago, son of Francisco de Paula Figueroa Araoz and of Rosalía Larraín Echeverría. He studied in the San Ignacio School and then went on to study law at the State University. He graduated in 1889 and that same year was named secretary to the Intendant of Santiago.

Figueroa decided to embark on a political career and joined the Liberal Democratic Party, which supported a stronger executive. He was elected deputy for Victoria and Melipilla in 1900 and reelected in 1903. In 1907, once his term had ended, he was selected to replace Juan José Valenzuela, deputy for Rere and Puchacay, who had died in July that year. In 1909, Figueroa was once again elected to the Chamber of Deputies, this time representing Itata.

On October 25, 1907, President Pedro Montt named Figueroa Minister of Justice, a position which he kept until September 15, 1909. President Montt died on August 16, 1910 and was replaced by his Minister of Interior, Elías Fernández Albano, who became acting president. Fernández named Figueroa Minister of Interior but died on September 6 that very year. Figueroa then replaced Fernández as acting president and stayed in that position until December 23, when Ramón Barros Luco was inaugurated as president.

Barros named Figueroa to the post of ambassador to Spain in 1911, and in 1914 became ambassador to Argentina. Figueroa was considered a harmless politician and the three major political parties in Chile, Conservative, Liberal, and Radical, chose him as a consensus candidate for the 1925 Chilean presidential election. The purpose of having a single candidate was to avoid political campaigning in the volatile political situation the country was in. Nevertheless, leftist José Santos Salas ignored the three parties' agreement and declared his candidacy, backed by the Social Republican Worker's Union.

Figueroa easily defeated Salas and became president on 23 December 1925. Figueroa kept the ambitious General Carlos Ibáñez as Minister of War, and later named him Minister of the Interior. In 1927, Ibáñez ordered the arrest of Figueroa's brother Javier Ángel, President of the Supreme Court. Unable to withstand the political pressure, Figueroa resigned and Ibáñez became acting president. After winning the presidential election that year with 98% of the vote, Ibáñez became president and wielded dictatorial powers.

Ibáñez named Figueroa ambassador to Peru in 1928. Upon his return in 1929, Figueroa became president of the Central Bank of Chile. He died in a car accident on May 15, 1931.

References

 San Francisco, Alejandro, and Ángel Soto, eds. Camino a La Moneda. Santiago: Centro De Estudios Bicentenario, 2005. 
 Collier, Simon, and William F. Sater. A History of Chile, 1808–2002. 2nd ed. Cambridge UP, 2002. 
 Biography of Figueroa from the Chilean Library of Congress

1866 births
1931 deaths
People from Santiago
Chilean people of Galician descent
Figueroa
Chilean people of Basque descent
Liberal Democratic Party (Chile, 1893) politicians
Presidents of Chile
Chilean Ministers of Justice
Deputies of the XXVI Legislative Period of the National Congress of Chile
Deputies of the XXVII Legislative Period of the National Congress of Chile
Deputies of the XXVIII Legislative Period of the National Congress of Chile
Deputies of the XXIX Legislative Period of the National Congress of Chile
Candidates for President of Chile
Presidents of the Central Bank of Chile
Ambassadors of Chile to Argentina
Ambassadors of Chile to Peru
Ambassadors of Chile to Spain
Instituto Nacional General José Miguel Carrera alumni
University of Chile alumni